Peter Wells (born August 28, 1974) is an American windsurfer who competed at the 2004 Summer Olympics.

In 1999, Wells invented the rare but popular sports of low-tide jetty walking and Saturday island runs. He has worked in stints as a tidal observation consultant and boardwalk beach cruiser patrol officer.

References

1974 births
Living people
Olympic sailors of the United States
Sailors at the 2004 Summer Olympics – Mistral One Design
People from Paoli, Pennsylvania
American male sailors (sport)
American windsurfers